Law enforcement in Spain is carried out by numerous organizations, not all of which operate in the same areas.

 The  Guardia Civil (Civil Guard) is the national gendarmerie force and therefore has a military status. It is the most powerful police force in Spain. It patrols the entire national territory (including highways and ports), except for those areas that belong to the National Police, enforces customs duties and investigates crimes therein (78,000). They operate from garrison posts that are called Casas cuartel ("home-garrisons") which are both minor residential garrisons and fully equipped Police stations. Answers to both the Ministry of Interior and the Ministry of Defence.
 The Policía Nacional or Cuerpo Nacional de Policía (the National Police Corps, or CNP) has a civilian status and deals with criminal offences and public order in big towns and cities (65,000). It includes special anti-riot units. In some Autonomous Communities, autonomous police forces have taken over many of the CNP duties. Answers to the Ministry of Interior.
 The Policía Local or Policía Municipal (known as Urban Guard in the city of Barcelona) operate in most cities and important towns, concentrating on preventing crime, settling minor incidents, traffic control,  and, crucially, intelligence gathering. Answers to the local governments (81,000).
 In some Autonomous Communities there is an autonomous police force, under the rule of the regional government, which carries out the duties of the Civil Guard and the National Police there. This police forces are the Troopers (Mossos d'Esquadra) in Catalonia (17.000), the Ertzaintza in the Basque Country (8,000), and the Chartered Police (Policía Foral or Foruzaingoa in Basque) in Navarre (1100). They answer to their respective autonomous governments. Although now an integral division of the Basque Ertzaintza, it answers to the provincial government of Álava.
 Additionally, there is a "special administrative police" which is not under the Ministry of the Interior nor the Ministry of Defence, but the Ministry of the Treasury. The Customs Surveillance Service is responsible for the investigation and prosecution of cases involving contraband, illegal drugs, financial evasion and violations, money laundering, surveillance for financial police purposes, and the provision of judicial police services. Despite their civilian status, the officers are trained by both the National Police and the Navy Marines.

Locally, all enforcement agencies work together closely, and in serious matters, usually under the guidance of an examining magistrate. Operational policy and major interventions are nationally coordinated under the direction of the Ministry of the Interior.

History

The medieval kings of León, Castile, and Aragón were often unable to maintain public peace, protective municipal leagues began to emerge in the twelfth century against bandits and other rural criminals, as well as against the lawless nobility or mobilized to support a claimant to the crown. These organizations were individually temporary but became a long-standing fixture of Spain.

The first recorded case of the formation of an hermandad occurred when the towns and the peasantry of the north united to police the pilgrim road to Santiago de Compostela in Galicia, and protect the pilgrims, a major source of regional income, against robber knights. With the countryside virtually everywhere effectively in the hands of nobles, throughout the High Middle Ages such brotherhoods were frequently formed by leagues of towns to protect the roads connecting them. The hermandades were occasionally co-opted for dynastic purposes. They acted to some extent like the Fehmic courts of Germany. Among the most powerful was the league of northern Castilian and Basque ports, the Hermandad de las Marismas: Toledo, Talavera, and Villa Real.

As one of their first acts after the War of the Castilian Succession, Ferdinand and Isabella "brought peace by the brilliant strategy of organizing rather than eliminating violence;" they established a centrally organized and efficient Holy Hermandad (Santa Hermandad) with themselves at its head. They adapted the existing form of the hermandad to the purpose of creating a general police force under the direction of officials appointed by themselves, and endowed with large powers of summary jurisdiction, even in capital cases. The rough and ready justice of the Santa Hermandades became famous for brutality. The original hermandades continued to serve as modest local police units until their final suppression in 1835.

20th century 

Today the principal forces of public order and security as of 1988 were the Civil Guard, founded in 1844, and the National Police Corps, founded in 1986. The Civil Guard, fortified by nearly a century and a half of tradition, was a highly disciplined paramilitary body with close links to the Spanish army. As it evolved, it served mainly as rural police to protect property and order and to reinforce the authority of the central government.

Under Francisco Franco, a tripartite system of police was formalized: the Civil Guard in rural areas; the Armed and Traffic Police (renamed the National Police in 1979), which fulfilled normal police functions in communities with a population of more than 20,000; and the Higher Police Corps of plainclothes police with responsibility for investigating crimes and political offenses. Separate municipal police forces under the control of local mayors were concerned mainly with traffic control and with enforcement of local ordinances.

The transition from Franco's dictatorship to a system of parliamentary democracy was accompanied by a major effort to bring the forces of law and order and the justice system into harmony with the new political era. The police were stripped of most of their military characteristics. The Civil Guard, which maintained order in rural areas and in smaller communities, retained many of its military features, but both the civil Guard and the police were placed under civilian leadership.

Once dedicated to repressing all evidence of opposition to the Franco regime, the police and the Civil Guard were expected to tolerate forms of conduct previously banned and to protect individual rights conferred by the 1978 Constitution and by subsequent legislation. Members of the Civil Guard continued to be implicated in cases of mistreatment and brutality in the campaign against Basque terrorism. The authorities had, however, prosecuted many civil guard officers for such infractions, with the result that by 1988 fewer violations of legal norms were being recorded.

Reforms of the judicial system included appointments of judges by a body insulated from political pressures and increased budgets to enable courts to deal with a chronic backlog of criminal hearings. The penal code was being modernized to bring it into conformity with the new Constitution. Some progress had been made in ensuring that defendants had effective legal representation and that they received speedier trials. Nevertheless, antiquated procedures and the escalation of crime continued to generate huge delays in the administration of justice, with the result that as much as half of the prison population in 1986 consisted of accused persons still awaiting trial.

During the Franco era, the police had been regarded as a reactionary element, associated in the public mind with internal surveillance and political repression. The Civil Guard and the Armed and Traffic Police were legally part of the armed forces, and their senior officers were drawn from the army. The 1978 Constitution effects the separation of the police from the military, and it emphasizes that one of the functions of the police is to safeguard personal liberties. Article 104 of the 1978 Constitution states that, "The Security Corps and Forces, responsible to the Government, shall have as their mission the protection of the free exercise of rights and liberties and the guaranteeing of the safety of citizens."

Although considerably delayed, a subsequent statute, the Organic Law on the Security Corps and Forces, was enacted in March 1986 to incorporate the mandate of the Constitution to redefine the functions and the operating principles of the police forces. With its passage, the final legal steps had been taken to make the police system conform to the requirements of the democratic regime, although most observers concluded that it would be years before the reforms were fully in effect.

The new organic law provided a common ethical code for police practices, affirmed trade union rights, recast the role of the judicial police serving under the courts and the public prosecutors, combined the uniformed and the non-uniformed police into the single National Police Corps, and redefined the missions and the chains of command of the various police bodies. The Civil Guard remained a separate paramilitary force, although in operational matters it was under the direction of the Ministry of Interior rather than the Ministry of Defence.

In time of war or emergency, it would revert to the authority of the minister of defence. In 1986 a new post of secretary of state for security was created in the Ministry of Interior to coordinate the activities of the National Police Corps and the Civil Guard. The National Police Corps functioned under the directives of the director-general of the National Police Corps, but local supervision was exercised by civil governors of the provinces where police forces served.

Although their powers were, in most cases, quite limited, the local police services of individual towns and cities complemented the work of the National Police Corps, dealing with such matters as traffic, parking, monitoring public demonstrations, guarding municipal buildings, and enforcing local ordinances. They also collaborated with the National Police Corps by providing personnel to assist in crowd control. Numbering about 37,000 individuals in 1986, the local police were generally armed only with pistols, although many smaller local police forces, particularly in Guipúzcoa, have continued to maintain an unarmed policing tradition, although this has met legal challenges recently and Eibar is set to have a fully armed local police force in 2020, with the 40 remaining unarmed police forces in the province likely to follow.

Under the Statutes of Autonomy of 1979, the Basque Country and Catalonia were granted authority to form their own regional police forces. Subsequently, ten of the seventeen autonomous regions were extended the right to create their own forces, but, as of 1988, only three areas—the Basque Country, Catalonia, and Navarre—had developed regional police units. The 1986 organic law defined the limits of competence for regional police forces, although the restrictions imposed did not apply to the existing forces in the Basque Country and Navarre and applied only in part to those in Catalonia.

Under the law, regional police could enforce regional legislation, protect regional offices, and, in cooperation with national forces, could police public places, control demonstrations and crowds, and perform duties in support of the judiciary. A Security Policy Council was established at the national level to ensure proper coordination with the new regional forces, which, as of 1986, numbered about 4,500 officers.

Forces

National 

Guardia Civil - Civil Guard - the national gendarmerie force responsible for general rural policing, firearms and explosives control; traffic policing on interurban roads; protection of communication routes, coasts, frontiers, ports, and airports; enforcement of environmental and conservation laws, including those governing hunting and fishing; and interurban transport of prisoners. The Guardia Civil has operated as military police in support of the Spanish armed forces on peace-keeping deployment.
Cuerpo Nacional de Policía - National Police Corp in communities with population of more than 20,000.
Servicio de Vigilancia Aduanera - Customs Service charged with customs inspections and the collection of import duties. In addition, they investigated smuggling, tax evasion, and illegal financial transactions, particularly those involving import-export businesses and currency exchange. Most of its uniformed and plainclothes police were stationed at frontier crossing points with France, Andorra, and Portugal, ports, and terminals of entry. Their monitoring of entries and departures by foreigners also produced a flow of information needed by internal security agencies.
Policía Portuaria - uniformed service similar to local police, but with additionally special administrative duties related to public safety in loading and unloading of vessels, storage of cargo etc.
 Agentes forestales - specialist service with powers similar to local police, but also responsible for maintaining forested areas in a safe condition. This uniformed force controls all hunting activities and has powers to prevent visitors from gathering or damaging wild plants, dumping rubbish, starting fires or behaving irresponsibly in addition to providing routine surveillance and fire extinction services via regular surface and airborne patrols as well as from fixed towers and strategic installations.

National Police serving as de facto autonomous police 

 Unidad del Cuerpo Nacional de Policía adscrita a la Comunidad Autónoma de Aragón.
 Unidad del Cuerpo Nacional de Policía adscrita a la Comunidad Autónoma de Galicia.
 Unidad del Cuerpo Nacional de Policía adscrita a la Comunidad Autónoma del Principado de Asturias.
 Unidad del Cuerpo Nacional de Policía adscrita a la Comunidad Autónoma de Valencia.
 Unidad del Cuerpo Nacional de Policía adscrita a la Comunidad Autónoma de Madrid.
 Unidad del Cuerpo Nacional de Policía adscrita a la Comunidad Autónoma de Andalucía.

Their missions are the custody of buildings belonging to the Autonomous Regions, VIP escort, coordination and control of safety functions with private security companies and inspection and control of gambling installations. Their uniforms are identical to the rest of the national police, although they carry distinctive insignia of the autonomous region they are attached to: the flag on the right arm and the shield on the cap. Their vehicles have a different livery.

Autonomous Communities 

Ertzaintza in the Basque Country
Mossos d'Esquadra in Catalonia
Policía Foral (Foruzaingoa) in Navarre
BESCAM in the Madrid region
Policía Canaria in the Canary Islands

Local 

Policía Municipal (also known as Policía Local or Guardia Urbana in some cities) in every town and city of 5,000 or more people, of which Madrid's is the largest force and Barcelona's is the second largest. Similar to other law enforcement agencies, Policia Local are also armed as well. Policia Local also use their own distinctive marked patrol vehicles which usually say "Policia Local" with the towns name written on the side as well.

Firearms

Most law enforcement officers in Spain are issued a sidearm to carry while they are on duty. In some cases of heightened alert officers have access to sub-machine guns and occasionally a rifle if needed. Some Spanish law enforcement tasked with guarding the areas around or at any government installation in Madrid will also have access to the Heckler & Koch MP5 9x19mm sub-machine gun or the Heckler & Koch G36 5.56x45mm rifle as seen at Ministry of Defense (Spain) buildings.

The most common sidearm in Spanish police service is the Heckler & Koch USP 9x19mm, generally in the USP Compact form which is used by the National Police, Guardia Civil and many regional and local police forces including officers in Madrid. The Walther P99 is also favored by many local police and some regional police with officers in Barcelona being issued the P99 as the duty sidearm. Glock handguns are also used by the regional police in Navarre, the Policía Foral and some local police forces. The Beretta 92 9x19mm handgun has also seen service with the Guardia Civil who currently uses it alongside the Heckler & Koch USP. The SIG Sauer P226 handgun is used by the local police in Bilbao.

Defunct police agencies
 Guardia de Asalto
 Carabineros de España
 Cuerpo Superior de Policía (Superior Police Corps)
 Guardia Nacional Republicana - Replaced the Guard Civil in Republican controlled areas during the Spanish Civil War
 Armed Police Corps
 Policia Territorial

See also 
 Crime in Spain
 Police ranks of Spain

References